Sakri is a village located in Fatehpur Tehsil of Kangra district in Himachal Pradesh, India. Rehan is the nearest town to this village. The pin code of this village is 176022.

Villages in Kangra district